Cristina Popescu may refer to:

 Cristina Popescu (rower) (born 1996), Romanian Olympic rower
 Cristina Popescu (tennis) (born 1969), Romanian-born Canadian tennis player